John Bradley (1844 – 14 November 1900) was an Australian politician.

Bradley was born in Dundee in Scotland in 1844 and arrived in Australia in 1855. In 1893 he was elected to the Tasmanian House of Assembly, representing the seat of South Hobart. In 1897 he was elected for the new multi-member seat of Hobart He served until his death in Hobart in 1900.

References

1844 births
1900 deaths
Members of the Tasmanian House of Assembly